40S ribosomal protein S11 is a protein that in humans is encoded by the RPS11 gene.

Ribosomes, the organelles that catalyze protein synthesis, consist of a small 40S subunit and a large 60S subunit. Together these subunits are composed of 4 RNA species and approximately 80 structurally distinct proteins. This gene encodes a ribosomal protein that is a component of the 40S subunit. The protein belongs to the S17P family of ribosomal proteins. It is located in the cytoplasm. The gene product of the E. coli ortholog (ribosomal protein S17) is thought to be involved in the recognition of termination codons. This gene is co-transcribed with a small nucleolar RNA gene, which is located in its third intron. As is typical for genes encoding ribosomal proteins, there are multiple processed pseudogenes of this gene dispersed through the genome.

References

Further reading

External links 
 

Ribosomal proteins